Logan Cooley (born May 4, 2004) is an American collegiate ice hockey player for the University of Minnesota of the National Collegiate Athletic Association (NCAA). Cooley was drafted third overall in the 2022 NHL Entry Draft by the Arizona Coyotes.

Playing career
Cooley was a top-ranked prospect for the 2022 NHL Draft according to NBC Sports. Various organizations such as TSN rank him between second and fifth. 

He is currently a center for the U.S. National U18 Team. He recently changed his commitment from the University of Notre Dame to the University of Minnesota.

International play

On December 12, 2022, Cooley was named to the United States men's national junior ice hockey team to compete at the 2023 World Junior Ice Hockey Championships. During the tournament he recorded seven goals and seven assists in seven games and won a bronze medal.

Career statistics

Regular season and playoffs

International

Awards and honors

References

External links
 

2004 births
Living people
American ice hockey centers
Arizona Coyotes draft picks
Ice hockey people from Pittsburgh
Minnesota Golden Gophers men's ice hockey players
National Hockey League first-round draft picks